Solstreif Island is the southernmost of the small group of islands at the east side of Foyn Harbor in Wilhelmina Bay, off the west coast of Graham Land. The feature was so named by whalers operating in the area because the Norwegian whaling vessel Solstreif was moored to it during 1921–22, and probably in other seasons also.

See also 
 List of Antarctic and sub-Antarctic islands

Islands of Graham Land
Danco Coast